Lindenbergh Francisco da Silva or simply Nêgo  (born May 23, 1985 in Ceará Mirim-RN), is a Brazilian right back who currently plays for Uberlândia.

Honours
Rio Grande do Norte State League: 2005, 2007
Pará State League: 2007
Minas Gerais State League: 2007

Contract
Atlético Mineiro: 2 January 2008 to 31 December 2010
ABC: 12 May 2011

External links
 atletico.com.br
 CBF
 galodogital

1985 births
Living people
Brazilian footballers
ABC Futebol Clube players
América Futebol Clube (MG) players
Clube do Remo players
Clube Atlético Mineiro players
Clube Atlético Bragantino players
Vila Nova Futebol Clube players
Association football defenders